Bentinckia is a genus of palms in the family Arecaceae. The genus is named after William Henry Cavendish-Bentinck a colonial governor general of British India. There are two species of palms in this genus. namely Bentinckia condapanna and Bentinckia nicobarica.

Distribution
Bentinckia condapanna is endemic to southern Western Ghats, where it occurs in steep rocky slopes of the high altitude rainforest region.

Bentinckia nicobarica is restricted to the lowland rainforest of Nicobar Islands.

References

 
Arecaceae genera
Flora of the Western Ghats
Taxonomy articles created by Polbot